"Center of the Universe" is a song by Swedish DJ and house music producer Axwell. It features vocals from Magnus Carlson, who co-wrote the song along with Axwell.

Charts

References

2013 songs
2013 singles
Songs written by Axwell
Axwell songs